Murat Vargı (born 1947) is a Turkish billionaire businessman, the founder,  chairman and president of MV Holding, and the founder of Turkcell, Turkey's largest mobile phone service provider.

Vargı was born in 1947. He has a bachelor's degree from the Helsinki School of Economics.

Vargı is married, with two children, and lives in Monaco, France.

References

1947 births
Living people
Turkish billionaires
Turkish businesspeople